Washington University in St. Louis School of Law (WashULaw) is the law school of Washington University in St. Louis, a private university in St. Louis, Missouri. WashULaw has consistently ranked among the top law schools in the country; it is currently ranked 16th among the 196 American Bar Association-approved law schools by U.S. News & World Report, and 6th in the country by AboveTheLaw.com. Prominent alumni include numerous U.S. senators, congressmen, governors, cabinet members, federal and state judges, businessmen, and scholars. Founded in 1867, WashULaw is the oldest continuously operating law school west of the Mississippi River (the oldest, Saint Louis University School of Law, operated briefly from 1843-1847 and was reestablished in 1908). The law school was originally located in downtown St. Louis, but relocated in 1904 to the Danforth Campus of Washington University in St. Louis.

Admissions
For the class entering in fall 2022, there were 260 matriculants. The 25th and 75th LSAT percentiles for the 2022 entering class were 164 and 173, respectively, with a median of 172. The 25th and 75th undergraduate GPA percentiles were 3.43 and 4.00, respectively, with a median of 3.94. The acceptance rate for JD candidates in 2022 was 18.02%.

Ranking and honors
The 2022 edition of U.S. News & World Report's "Best Law Schools" ranked Washington University School of Law: 
 16th in the country overall (out of 196 law schools)
 9th in the country in Clinical Training
 19th in the country in Trial Advocacy
 19th in the country in Dispute Resolution
 20th in the country in Constitutional Law

Above The Law ranked Washington University School of Law 6th in their annual Top 50 Law School Rankings.

 

GraduatePrograms.com ranked Washington University as number 1 for social life.

Degree program

Juris Doctoris (JD) program
Most of the students at Washington University School of Law are enrolled in the Juris Doctor (JD) program.  JD students are required to take 86 semester hours of credit in order to graduate. In the first year of law school all students are required to take one semester each of Contracts, Property, Torts, Civil Procedure, Constitutional Law, and Criminal Law.  Additionally, in fall of their first year all students are required to take  Legal Practice I and Legal Research Methodologies I, and in spring of their first year students are required to take Legal Practice II and Legal Research Methodologies II. For the entering class of 2016–2017 all first-year students took Civil Procedure in the spring; the rest of the first-year doctrinal courses were offered in both fall and spring. It remains to be seen if that scheduling practice will continue in the future. The second and third year offer more flexibility in planning the student's curriculum as there are only two mandatory classes (a class from the ethics curriculum and one seminar). In addition to their substantive coursework, many second and third-year students participate in moot court, a scholarly publication, a clinic, or an externship.

Joint Degree programs
For students interested in a more general interdisciplinary course of study, the School of Law offers five joint degree programs (usually completed in four years, as opposed to three for a standard JD):
JD-MBA, with Washington University's Olin Business School
JD-M.A. in East Asian Studies, with the Washington University School of Arts and Sciences 
JD-M.A. in Economics, with the Washington University School of Arts and Sciences
JD-MHA in Health Administration, with the Washington University School of Medicine
JD-MSW, with Washington University's George Warren Brown School of Social Work
JD-LL.M, with University of Queensland

Master of Laws (LL.M.) program
Washington University School of Law offers an LL.M. in U.S. Law for International Students, an LL.M. in Negotiation and Dispute Resolution, an LL.M. in Intellectual Property & Technology Law, and an LL.M. in Taxation. An Online Master of Laws in U.S. Law program and an Online Master of Legal Studies program are also available. Additionally, the school offers a Dual LL.M. Degree with the Tecnológico de Monterrey's Escuela de Gobierno y Transformación Pública.

Master of Legal Studies (MLS) program
This program is a graduate program designed for non-lawyers. Students in the MLS program may choose to study the legal system broadly or may choose to pursue focused course of study in a particular area.

Juris Scientiae Doctoris (JSD) program
The JSD program of Washington University School of Law is very small and geared towards exceptional candidates who have a sophisticated scholarly focus. The JSD program emphasizes original research and writing culminating in the preparation of a significant and extensive dissertation of publishable quality.

Online Law Programs 
In January 2013, Washington University School of Law began offering an online LL.M. in U.S. Law degree for international lawyers. Students in the program attend live, virtual lectures weekly and participate in classroom discussions using the Socratic method. The school also offers an online Master of Legal Studies degree and a dual LL.M. degree.

Online LL.M. in Taxation Program

Washington University School of Law now offers an online LL.M. degree in Taxation for U.S. candidates who already possess a J.D. degree, and for foreign lawyers.

Online LL.M. Program 
The Master of Laws in U.S. Law program at Washington University's School of Law is an online degree offering meant for international lawyers. Students will learn to research and write like a U.S. lawyer. The LL.M. curriculum consists of live online classes with weekly coursework. When a student completes the program, they are eligible to sit for the bar exam in both California and Washington State.

Online Master of Legal Studies Program 
The online Master of Legal Studies degree from Washington University School of Law aims to develop practical legal skill sets including analytical thinking, legal research, and a comprehensive understanding of U.S. legal concepts. The program is designed for non-lawyers who want to advance their careers with legal acumen in a wide variety of professions. The curriculum focuses on appropriate legal procedure with regard to contracts, intellectual property, business associations, negotiation, immigration law, and cyber security.

Moot court competitions
The school's moot court program includes the Giles Rich Moot Court Competition, sponsored by the American Intellectual Property Law Association, the Saul Lefkowitz Moot Court Competition, sponsored by the International Trademark Association (INTA), the Philip C. Jessup International Law Moot Court Competition, sponsored by the International Law Students Association, the Niagara International Arbitration Competition, and Environmental, National Appellate Advocacy, William E. McGee National Civil Rights, and Wiley Rutledge Moot Court Competitions.

From 1998 to 2009, Washington University advanced from the regional competition to the Shearman & Sterling International Rounds of the competition seven times, a feat only matched by Harvard Law. In 2008, the team took first place in the Dillard Competition for the Best Memorial out of all the national and regional competitions in the world.  WashULaw’s team's brief not only defeated more than 120 U.S. law schools, but more than hundreds of teams that competed from more than 100 countries around the world. Additionally, in 2009, the National Moot Court Team won the William E. McGee National Civil Rights Moot Court Competition. The team went undefeated through seven rounds of competition to win the championship with three students receiving unanimous decisions on the scorecard of every judge in every round they argued. 

The National Moot Court Team also won the Midwest Regional of the American Bar Association’s National Appellate Advocacy Competition and advanced to the National Representation in Mediation Competition. 

The Trial Team, who won first place at the Regional Qualifying Tournament of the ABA/American College of Trial Lawyers National Trial Competition, advanced to the National Finals of the NTC against the 22 other national qualifiers. 

Additionally, the Niagara International Law Moot Court Team placed third out of 19 teams and advanced to the semifinals and the National Environmental Moot Court Competition Team advanced to the quarterfinals at Pace University’s competition in New York, ranking third out of 74 teams.

Lastly, WashULaw’s team placed first overall along with best brief at the 2022 Regional Qualifying Tournament of the International Trademark Association’s Saul Lefkowitz Moot Court Competition and advanced to the National Finals.

Clinical program
The clinical program at Washington University School of Law is ranked by U.S. News & World Report seventh in the nation, and claims to "provide students opportunities to learn professional skills and values by working in the real world with clients, attorneys, judges, and legislators".

Appellate advocacy
Students in the Appellate Clinic represent pro se litigants in cases to be heard on appeal in the United States Court of Appeals for the Eighth Circuit. After the clerk of the court assigns cases at the beginning of the semester, students handle all aspects of the appeal, including motions, filings, and briefs. The representation typically provides at least one student each semester an opportunity to argue a case before a panel of the Eighth Circuit.

Civil Justice
The Civil Justice Clinic requires students to handle their own case load under the supervision of the faculty.  In utilizing the student body for representation, the Civil Justice Clinic assists in the provision of legal services to needy members of the community and imparts the obligation for public service. The Clinic also includes a weekly seminar.

Civil Rights and Community Justice
In the Civil Rights and Community Justice Clinic, students work in the fields of immigration and employment discrimination.  Students are placed at Legal Aid, selected non-profits, the Equal Employment Opportunity Commission, and in selected plaintiff law firms to assist on immigration status and immigrants rights cases as well as cases of alleged discrimination based on race, religion, national origin, sex, age, and disability in employment, education, and other arenas. Students engage in interviewing, counseling, case analysis and planning, problem solving, fact investigation, document drafting, negotiation, mediation, and community education. In addition to law office practice, the Civil Rights and Community Justice Clinic includes an in-house component in which students observe and conduct mediations, assist in at least one legislative drafting experience, and participate in at least one civil rights community education project of the student's choosing.  The Civil Rights and Community Justice Clinic became involved in larger scale community lawyering by assisting on the lawsuit opposing the anti-immigrant ordinances in Valley Park, Missouri.

Criminal Justice
The Criminal Justice Clinic operates in collaboration with the St. Louis County office of the Missouri State Public Defender System, located approximately one mile from the law school in the St. Louis County Justice Center. The Criminal Justice Clinic exposes students to real life lawyering skills within the framework of the state level criminal justice system. Clinic students have the opportunity to serve as Rule 13 certified legal interns, and perform the work of a lawyer, representing clients facing criminal charges.

Congressional and Administrative Law
In this clinic, approximately 24 third-year law students spend their spring semester in Washington D.C. and work under the direction of attorneys in a variety of government offices.  Examples include the House and Senate Judiciary Committee, the Civil Rights Division of the Justice Department, the Corporate Finance Section of the Securities and Exchange Commission, the United States Environmental Protection Agency and the United States Patent and Trademark Office.

As prerequisite to taking this course, students participating in the Congressional and Administrative Law Clinic are required to enroll a course on ethics in government in addition to their daily work at the internship.

Government Lawyering
The Government Lawyering Clinic provides the opportunity for students to work with attorneys in the Criminal or Civil Division of the United States Attorney’s Office.Students in this Clinic work in the Eastern District of Missouri office in St. Louis or the Southern District of Illinois office in East St. Louis.   Clinic students in the Criminal Division participate in criminal investigations and prosecution (from initial fact investigations to final appellate work).

Interdisciplinary Environmental
This Clinic consists of both "student attorneys" (second and third year law students) and "student consultants" (graduate and upper-level undergraduates students of Washington University studying engineering, environmental studies, medicine, social work and/or business), work in interdisciplinary teams under faculty supervision. These teams offer legal and technical assistance on environmental and community health problems to individuals and organizations that cannot afford to pay for such services. Clinic teams work on issues relating to air and water quality, lead poisoning, environmental justice, habitat destruction and wetlands.

In March 2007, the Interdisciplinary Environmental Clinic helped reach a milestone agreement between Sierra Club and Kansas City Power & Light ("KCPL").  This agreement requires KCPL to make the most significant carbon reduction commitments of any utility in the Midwest.

Intellectual Property and Nonprofit Organizations
Students in this Clinic collaborate with students from the School of Medicine, Olin School of Business, the Department of Biomedical Engineering, the George Warren Brown School of Social Work, and Arts & Sciences; and to provide intellectual property and business formation legal services to clients who might otherwise not have access to competent legal counsel.
It works with St. Louis-area IP attorneys to provide early stage legal advice to other innovators and entrepreneurs, especially with business incubators in the St. Louis area; work with nonprofit organizations such as: St. Louis Volunteer Lawyers and Accountants for the Arts (VLAA), and Public Interest Intellectual Property Advisors (PIIPA).

Judicial Clerkship
The Judicial Clerkship externship exposes students to civil and criminal litigation from the judicial perspective. Students work as part-time law clerks under the supervision of local, state or federal trial or appellate judges. Students participating in the  externship course observe hearings, trials and other court proceedings; perform legal research; and draft a series of legal memoranda relevant to cases under submission by the courts.

Student publications

The Washington University School of Law has four student-run publications.  After the completion of their first year, students are encouraged to participate in a "write-on" competition.  This competition has generally entailed writing a case comment.  Based upon the quality of a student's case comment, a student may be invited to join the publication of their choice.  Second-year students participating in one of the three Washington University School of Law student-run publications are considered "associate" or "staff" editors.  In addition to their editing responsibilities (which generally consist of "shelf-checks"), these students are required to write a "note."  Based upon the quality of their writing, students may be asked to publish their note in the publication in which they belong.  Rising third-year law students are encouraged to apply for an editorial position within their publication.  These board positions range from lower-level editing positions to the editor-in-chief position.

 Washington University Law Review began as the St. Louis Law Review in 1915 and was re-titled the Washington University Law Quarterly in 1936. The Law Review is a student-run academic journal that publishes six issues per year.  The staff selects and edits articles from legal scholars, practitioners, and students, and welcomes submissions on any legal topic. In addition to the printed publications, Law Review maintains an online supplement entitled Slip Opinions featuring original commentary and debate by members of the legal academy, bench, and bar.
 Washington University Journal of Law and Policy originated in 1968 as the Urban Law Annual and focused entirely on issues surrounding land use, urban development, and other legal concerns of urban communities. The scope broadened in 1983 when the Journal expanded (and became the Journal of Urban and Contemporary Law) to encompass a broad range of topics. In 1999, the Journal once again broadened its scope to become the Washington University Journal of Law and Policy. The Journal generates a symposium-based publication that brings together communities of scholars, to emphasize existing and emerging visions of the law in relation to interdisciplinary and multicultural perspectives, the implications of technology, and the consequences of economic globalization for the purpose of influencing law and social policy. Each year, the Journal publishes an "Access to Justice" volume. This volume is a compilation of essays from the Washington University School of Law’s "Access to Justice" speaker series, one goal of which is to encourage and challenge audiences to use their legal education for the ultimate betterment of our society. Additionally, the Journal collaborates with faculty members to publish symposia along a broad spectrum of contemporary topics.
 Washington University Global Studies Law Review is a student-edited international legal journal dedicated to publishing articles by international, foreign, and comparative law scholars. Global publishes quarterly. Global's publications present articles, book reviews, essays, and notes from academics, practitioners, and students, respectively.  Global occasionally publishes articles in conjunction with symposia from the Whitney R. Harris World Law Institute, such as the famous The Judgment at Nuremberg, which included articles by the President of the International Criminal Court Hon. Philippe Kirsch, Leila Nadya Sadat, and Sen. Chris Dodd. Global has published articles from practitioners and law professors from various countries including Brazil, the Netherlands, India, Finland, Myanmar, and Australia.  In addition to publishing, since 2007 the staff of Global has worked to create an International Citation Manual in order to provide the most accurate citations for international sources.  Still a work in progress, Global has compiled citation formats for more than sixty countries.
 Washington University Jurisprudence Review was formed in 2008 and is the only student-edited, in-print journal of law and philosophy in America.  The purpose of the Review is to promote academic discussion and scholarship at the nexus between law and philosophy.  It also seeks to broaden and deepen the law school experience by fostering critical analysis of the suppositions and theories that underlie the law school curriculum.  To further these purposes, the Review publishes scholar- and practitioner-authored articles, as well as  student-authored notes.

Student organizations
The Washington University School of Law has an always-evolving variety of student organizations.  A majority of these organizations represent a local chapter of a larger national organization. In addition to the organizations which represent as national chapter, Washington University School of Law has several student organizations that are unique to the law school. Most recently, the school has garnered recognition as the home of the founding Alpha Chapter of the first Law-predicated Social Fraternity in United States history, "Lambda Beta Sigma," housed in the historic Freer-Bradley Lounge.

Campus

Founded in 1867, WashULaw is the oldest continuously operating law school west of the Mississippi River (the oldest, Saint Louis University School of Law, operated briefly from 1843-1847 and was reestablished in 1908). The law school was originally located in downtown St. Louis but relocated in 1904 to the Danforth Campus of Washington University in St. Louis.

In January 1997, Washington University School of Law moved into Anheuser-Busch Hall. Anheuser-Busch Hall architecturally mirrors the classic style of the Washington University Danforth Campus. Anheuser-Busch Hall includes two fully functional courtrooms; numerous classrooms; and an open-stacks Law Library. Additionally, AB Hall includes common areas, such as the W.L. Hadley Griffin Student Commons and the glass-domed Crowder Courtyard.  In AB Hall all classrooms, seminar rooms, and breakout rooms have both computing and multimedia capabilities. Each classroom and seminar room is also equipped with a multimedia projection system. This allows instructors to video-tape classes and post the lectures online.

Construction of a new Social Sciences and Law Building has been finished.  The new building is situated just southwest of Anheuser-Busch Hall. Ground was broken for the four-story, Collegiate Gothic building on September 5, 2006; the targeted date for completion was June 30, 2008.  About  of the new building’s 142,000 net square feet were earmarked for the law school, housing some administrative offices, law journal offices, and classrooms.

Employment 
According to WashU Law's official 2018 ABA-required disclosures, 87.1% of 2018 graduates had secured full-time, long-term, JD-required employment within nine months of graduation. A total of 52.1% had found employment in firms of more than 100 lawyers or had secured federal judicial clerkships. WashU Law's Law School Transparency under-employment score was 5.7%, indicating the percentage of the Class of 2018 unemployed, pursuing an additional degree, or working in a non-professional, short-term, or part-time job nine months after graduation.

For new graduates, the self-reported median starting salary for the class of 2018 was $162,500 in the private sector, and $57,000 in the public sector. WashU Law placed 55 graduates from the class of 2013 at NLJ 350 firms, ranking it 25th on the National Law Journal "Go-To Schools" for large law firm employment.

Costs
The total cost of attendance (indicating the cost of tuition, fees, and living expenses) at Wash U Law for the 2019–2020 academic year was $83,654.

Notable alumni

Academia and business
 Edward Cranch Eliot of the Eliot family (AB 1878, LLB 1880, AM 1881): former president of the American Bar Association
 Francis J. Beckwith (MJS 2001): philosopher

Government and politics
 Carl J. Artman (JD): Assistant Secretary of the Interior for Indian Affairs, and head of the Bureau of Indian Affairs 2007–08
 David Bohigian, Assistant Secretary of Commerce from 2005 to 2009 under George W. Bush
 Henry S. Caulfield (JD 1895): Governor of Missouri, 1929–1933
 Clark M. Clifford (LLB 1928): U.S. Secretary of Defense, 1968–69; presidential advisor
 Earl Thomas Coleman (JD 1969): U.S. congressman from Missouri, 1977–1993
 Edward Coke Crow (LLB 1879): 23rd Attorney General of Missouri, 1897–1905, advisor to Missouri Governor Lloyd Crow Stark (1937–1941)
 Dwight F. Davis (LLB): founder of Davis Cup, and 49th US Secretary of War
 Alan J. Dixon (LLB 1949): U.S. Senator from Illinois, 1981–93
 Leonidas C. Dyer (JD 1893): U.S. congressman from Missouri, 1915–1933
 Harry B. Hawes (JD 1896): U.S. Senator from Missouri, 1926–1933
 Thomas C. Hennings, Jr. (JD 1926): U.S. Senator from Missouri, 1951–1960
 William L. Igoe (JD 1902): U.S. congressman from Missouri, 1913–1921
 Alphonso Jackson (JD 1972): U.S. Secretary of Housing and Urban Development, 2004–2008
 Jonathan Kanter (JD): Assistant Attorney General, United States Department of Justice Antitrust Division 
 Andrew G. McCabe (JD 1993): 16th deputy director of the FBI
 Victor J. Miller (JD): mayor of St. Louis, 1925 to 1933
 Roscoe C. Patterson (JD 1897): U.S. Senator from Missouri, 1929–1935
 Kenneth J. Rothman (AB, JD): Lieutenant Governor of Missouri, 1981–1985
 Steven Rothman (JD 1977): US Congressman from New Jersey, 1997–present
 Ralph Tyler Smith (JD 1940): U.S. Senator from Illinois, 1969–1970
 Selden P. Spencer (JD 1886): U.S. Senator from Missouri, 1918–1925
 Louis Susman (JD): United States Ambassador to Great Britain
 William H. Webster (JD 1949): 14th director of the CIA and the 6th director of the FBI
 Andrew Wheeler (JD): 15th administrator of the United States Environmental Protection Agency under Donald J. Trump
 Xenophon P. Wilfley (JD 1899): U.S. Senator from Missouri, 1918
 George Howard Williams (JD 1897): U.S. Senator from Missouri, 1925–1926

Judiciary

 Robert E. Bacharach (JD 1985): current judge, United States Court of Appeals for the Tenth Circuit
 David Bernhard (JD 1985): current judge, Fairfax Circuit Court, Virginia
 Michael Cherry (JD 1969): chief justice, Supreme Court of Nevada, 2006–present
 Audrey G. Fleissig (JD 1980): current judge, United States District Court for the Eastern District of Missouri
 Raymond W. Gruender (JD/MBA 1987): current judge, United States Court of Appeals for the Eighth Circuit
 Jean Constance Hamilton (JD 1971): current judge, United States District Court for the Eastern District of Missouri
 Andrew Jackson Higgins (JD 1948): former judge, former chief justice, Supreme Court of Missouri
 John Francis Nangle (JD 1948): former chief judge, United States District Court for the Eastern District of Missouri, 1983–1990
 Catherine D. Perry (JD 1980): current judge, United States District Court for the Eastern District of Missouri
 Rodney W. Sippel (JD 1981): current judge, United States District Court for the Eastern District of Missouri
 Richard B. Teitelman (JD 1973): former judge, former chief justice, Supreme Court of Missouri

Other
 Phoebe Couzins (LLB 1871): first female U.S. Marshal; feminist; leader in the women's suffrage movement
 Jordan French (JD 2010): writer and 3D food printing pioneer
 Eric P. Newman (JD 1935): numismatist 
 Phyllis Schlafly (AB 1944, JD 1978): author, lawyer, conservative and antifeminist activist
 Luther Ely Smith (JD 1897): founder of Gateway Arch National Park

References

External links
 

Washington University School of Law
Educational institutions established in 1867
Washington University in St. Louis campus
1867 establishments in Missouri
University subdivisions in Missouri
Law schools in Missouri